Michael Ingham may refer to:

Michael Ingham (bishop) (born 1949), English-Canadian bishop
Michael Ingham (footballer) (born 1980), English-born Northern Irish footballer
 Michael Ingham (cricketer) (born 1957), English cricketer
Mike Ingham (born 1950), English football commentator